Penrose Peak may refer to:

 Penrose Peak (Montana)
 Penrose Peak (Wyoming)

See also
 Mount Penrose (Montana)
 Mount Penrose (British Columbia, Canada)